Kaili South railway station is a railway station of Hangchangkun Passenger Railway located in Guizhou, China.

Railway stations in Guizhou
Qiandongnan Miao and Dong Autonomous Prefecture